Shropshire County Council was the county council of the non-metropolitan county of Shropshire in England.

History
The Council came into its powers under the Local Government Act 1888 on 1 April 1889 and was known as Salop County Council from formation until 1 April 1980. It was based at the Old Shirehall in Market square, Shrewsbury until it moved to the new Shirehall in Abbey Foregate in Shrewsbury in 1966.

Wrekin unitary

The area covered by the council was decreased in 1998 when the Telford and Wrekin unitary authority was created, removing The Wrekin district from the non-metropolitan county of Shropshire.

County unitary

The county council was replaced, along with the county's five district councils, by a unitary authority called Shropshire Council on 1 April 2009. However, as the 'continuing authority', the councillors of the county council became the councillors of the new authority for the interim period until the first elections to Shropshire Council were held on 4 June 2009.

See also
Shropshire local elections
1977 Salop County Council election
2001 Shropshire County Council election
2005 Shropshire County Council election
Telford child sexual exploitation scandal

References

Former county councils of England
1889 establishments in England
2009 disestablishments in England
Local government in Shropshire